It Goes, It Goes (Forever & Ever) is the debut album by Dublin band Halves.
It was released late 2010 in Ireland (and June 2011 in UK/Europe) through the band's own record label
'Hateistheenemy'.

Recording
Recorded in the legendary Hotel2Tango studios in Montreal (housed in a former alarm factory beside a freight railroad) and tracked over two sunny weeks in August 2009, It Goes, It Goes (Forever & Ever) was created with the use of the studio's vast collection of instruments, amps, organs, effects (most of which dated from 1930's-1980's). Eleven songs were recorded live, in one large room on 2" reel-to-reel tape by Efrim Menuck (Godspeed You! Black Emperor), Howard Bilerman and Radwan Moumneh.

On returning to Ireland additional recording resumed with Richard McCullough in the band's own studio 'The Windfarm' and in various locations nationwide. Guest performers on the record include: Amy Millan (Stars/Broken Social Scene), Katie Kim, Phil Boughton (Subplots), Canadian harpist Elaine Kelly-Canning, Irish Chamber brass and string players and twenty-seven members of the Kilkenny choir.

The album's title 'It Goes, It Goes' refers to a signal the band were given by their engineer one day that the tape machine was rolling, making them laugh and ruin the take.

Release
The album was released on CD, mp3 and deluxe vinyl on 30 October 2010 on their own Hateisthenemy label. The vinyl edition is gatefold 180grm vinyl with the album's lyrics etched on the D side. Reviews from Ireland and the UK were unanimously positive and praised it for its bold ambition "a debut that works from its first moment to its last...music that belongs to the witching hour" (The Irish Times Album of the Week). In January 2011 it was announced that the album had been nominated for the 2010 Choice Music Prize. The band performed two tracks at the ceremony in March that year but the award went to Two Door Cinema Club. In April 2012 the band released 'Live at The Unitarian Church' on vinyl for Record Store Day which features updated versions of songs from 'It Goes, It Goes' plus songs from their first EP releases.

At the beginning of 2011, brothers Donal and Colum Mangan produced a video for the song, 'Darling, You'll Meet Your Maker' from the album. The video combines the fields of model making, stop motion animation and computer animation. It depicts a small mouse's efforts to survive following the loss of his partner and his eventual survival and revenge against the perpetrator. The video can be seen at the following link:

Halves – Darling, You'll Meet Your Maker

Track listing
All tracks written by Halves.
 "Land/Sea/People" – 5:01
 "Blood Branches" – 3:36
 "Darling, You'll Meet Your Maker" – 5:19
 "Growing & Glow" – 4:41
 "The Little Octoberist – 5:53
 "Haunt Me When I'm Drowsy – 4:53
 "The Wellwisher" – 4:45
 "I Raise Bears" – 5:52
 "Don't Send Your Kids to the Lakes" – 2:47
 "Mountain Bell" – 7:23

References

External links
 Halves site
 Facebook
 YouTube
 Twitter
 Halves photography

2010 debut albums
Halves (band) albums
Self-released albums